Distoechodon is a genus of cyprinid fishes that occur in East Asia, one species endemic to mainland China and the other in both mainland China and Taiwan.

Species
Distoechodon macrophthalmus Y. H. Zhao, F. F. Kullander, S. O. Kullander & C. G. Zhang, 2009 (Red-wing fish)
Distoechodon tumirostris W. K. H. Peters, 1881

References

 

Cyprinid fish of Asia
Freshwater fish of China
Cyprinidae genera
Xenocyprinae
Taxa named by Wilhelm Peters